WBEV-FM (95.3 MHz) is a radio station broadcasting a full-service oldies music format. Licensed to Beaver Dam, Wisconsin, United States, the station is currently owned by Good Karma Brands.

On July 12, 2019, the then-WXRO changed formats from country to hot adult contemporary, branded as "95X".

On August 1, 2022, WXRO flipped to full-service oldies as a simulcast of WBEV under the WBEV-FM call sign, with the AM station to flip to sports on August 15.

References

External links

BEV-FM
Radio stations established in 1968
1968 establishments in Wisconsin
Oldies radio stations in the United States
Beaver Dam, Wisconsin